Daniël van Son (born 14 February 1994) is a Dutch footballer who plays as a winger for Koninklijke HFC in the Tweede Divisie.

References

External links
 

1994 births
Living people
Dutch footballers
FC Volendam players
Eerste Divisie players
Tweede Divisie players
People from Purmerend
Association football wingers
Amsterdamsche FC players
FC Utrecht players
Koninklijke HFC players
Footballers from North Holland